Creta Forata (Crete Forade in Friulian) is a mountain of the Carnic Alps that lies on the border of Veneto and Friuli, northeast Italy, with an elevation of 2,462 m. It is located near the village of Sappada in the Piave Valley. Formed of limestone, it is the highest mountain of the eastern Terza - Siera Group and boasts a twin summit. It is of a similarly rugged nature as the Dolomites to the west.

References 

Mountains of the Alps
Mountains of Veneto